Emergency Management Victoria (EMV) is a state government statutory authority responsible for leading emergency management in Victoria, Australia by working with communities, government, agencies and business to strengthen their capacity to withstand, plan for, respond to and recover from emergencies.

Established in July 2014, Emergency Management Victoria plays a key role in implementing the Victorian Government’s emergency management agenda.

Role and responsibilities 
Emergency Management Victoria's role and responsibilities include:
 maximising the ability of the emergency management sector to work together and achieve joined up outcomes that are community focused
 facilitating key initiatives focused on system-wide reform with integrated policy, strategy, planning, investment and procurement
 ensuring a stronger emphasis on shared responsibility, community resilience, consequence management and post emergency recovery activities
 embedding emergency management across government, agencies and business
 leading and coordinating emergency preparedness, response and recovery with the emergency management sector and community

EMV supports the Emergency Management Commissioner, who has overall responsibility for coordination before, during and after major emergencies including management of consequences of an emergency.

EMV is an integral part of the emergency management sector and shares responsibility with a range of agencies, organisations and departments for ensuring the system of emergency management in Victoria is sustainable, effective and community focussed. Other government departments and agencies involved with emergency management include the Department of Environment, Land, Water and Planning, the Department of Premier and Cabinet, Health and Human Services, Ambulance Victoria and Victoria Police.

Management and reporting 
The Emergency Management Commissioner is Andrew Crisp.

The Chief Executive responsible for the day-to-day management of Emergency Management Victoria is Kate Fitzgerald, who also holds the position Deputy Secretary, Emergency Management in the Department of Justice and Community Safety.

The Minister responsible is Jaclyn Symes, Attorney-General and Minister for Emergency Services.

Commissioners
The following individuals have served as Emergency Management Commissioners:

References

External links 
Emergency Management Victoria

Government agencies of Victoria (Australia)
Government agencies established in 2014
2014 establishments in Australia
Emergency services in Victoria (Australia)